Carolyn Grace ( – 2 December 2022)  was an Australian-British pilot and aircraft restorer, and the only qualified female pilot of the Supermarine Spitfire since World War II.

Early life 
Grace grew up on a farm in New South Wales, where air travel was an essential part of everyday travel to cover long distances in rural Australia. In 1979, her husband Nick found two Spitfires for sale, and decided to buy them. They continued the restoration work in the 1980s, while Grace learned to fly a biplane.

Pilot career 
Following Nick's death after a car crash in 1988, Grace learned to fly the Spitfire. In 1990, she made her first solo Spitfire flight and qualified as a pilot for the aircraft. While female test pilots had flown the Spitfire during World War II as part of the Air Transport Auxiliary, Grace was the first qualified female pilot ever to take part in display flying, leading the way for others to follow.

Though she was pressured not to take up solo flying as a widow with two children, Grace felt she needed to in order to commemorate her late husband. She subsequently accumulated 900 flying hours, performing at various air shows and memorial events. The Spitfire ML407, which she and her husband had restored to working order, became known as the "Grace Spitfire". The aircraft was kept at RAF Bentwaters, Woodbridge, Suffolk, and the expensive insurance costs were met by Aon, who sponsored her events.

In 2004, Grace flew this Spitfire over Chartwell, former residence of Winston Churchill, to commemorate the 60th anniversary of D-Day. In 2011, she flew the plane as part of the 75th anniversary of the Spitfire's first flight in 1936.

Grace died after a car accident at Goulburn, New South Wales, on 2 December 2022, at the age of 70.

References

1950s births
Year of birth missing
2022 deaths
Supermarine Spitfire
People from New South Wales
Australian women aviators
Road incident deaths in New South Wales